Lycastris is a genus of hoverfly in the family Syrphidae.

Species
Lycastris albipes Walker, 1857
Lycastris austeni Brunetti, 1923
Lycastris cornuta Enderlein, 1910
Lycastris flavicrinis Cheng, 2012
Lycastris flaviscutatus Huo & Ren, 2009
Lycastris flavohirta Brunetti, 1907
Lycastris griseipennis Coe, 1964

References

Hoverfly genera
Eristalinae
Diptera of Asia
Taxa named by Francis Walker (entomologist)